Stanci may refer to:

 Stanci (Kruševac), a village in Serbia
 Stanci (Aleksinac), a village in Serbia
 Stanci, Kriva Palanka, a village in North Macedonia